Demoine Adams (born August 17, 1980) is a Canadian football defensive end who played for the Edmonton Eskimos of the Canadian Football League. Adams played in one regular season game, recording one tackle.

References 

1980 births
Nebraska Cornhuskers football players
Edmonton Elks players
American football defensive ends
Canadian football defensive linemen
Players of Canadian football from Arkansas
Living people
Players of American football from Arkansas
Sportspeople from Pine Bluff, Arkansas